Ventura, officially named San Buenaventura (Spanish for "Saint Bonaventure"), is a city on the Southern Coast of the U.S. state of California and the county seat of Ventura County. The population was 110,763 at the 2020 census. Ventura is a popular tourist destination, owing to its historic landmarks, beaches, and resorts.

Ventura has been inhabited by different peoples, including the Chumash Native Americans, for at least 10,000 years. With the arrival of Spanish missionaries in 1782, Mission San Buenaventura was established by Junípero Serra, giving the city its name. Following the Mexican secularization of the Californian missions, San Buenaventura was granted by Governor Pío Pico to Don José de Arnaz as Rancho Ex-Mission San Buenaventura and a small community arose. Following the American Conquest of California, San Buenaventura eventually incorporated as a city in 1866. The 1920s brought a major oil boom, which along with the post–World War II economic expansion, significantly developed and expanded Ventura.

History

Chumash 
Archaeological discoveries in the area suggest that humans have populated the region for at least 10,000–12,000 years. Archaeological research demonstrates that the Chumash people have deep roots in central and southern coastal regions of California, and has revealed artifacts from their culture. Shisholop Village, designated Historic Point of Interest #18 by the city at the foot of nearby Figueroa Street, was the site of a Chumash village. They had keen oceanic navigational skills made use of the abundant local resources from sea and land. The Ventura Chumash were in contact with the Channel Islands Chumash; both mainland and island Chumash utilized large plank-sewn seagoing canoes, called Tomol, with the island people bringing shell bead money, island chert, and sea otter pelts to trade for mainland products like acorns and deer meat.

Spanish era

In 1769, the Spanish Portolà expedition, first recorded European visitors to inland areas of California, came down the Santa Clara River Valley from the previous night's encampment near today's Saticoy and camped near the outlet of the Ventura River on August 14. Fray Juan Crespi, a Franciscan missionary traveling with the expedition, noted that "we saw a regular town, the most populous and best laid-out of all that we had seen on the journey up to the present time." Archaeological records found that the Chumash village they encountered was settled sometime around A.D. 1000.
Junípero Serra, first leader of the Franciscans in California, founded Mission San Buenaventura in 1782 as his ninth and last mission established near the Chumash village as part of Spain's colonization of Alta California. The mission was named for St. Bonaventure, a Thirteenth Century Franciscan saint and a Doctor of the Church. San Miguel Chapel was the first outpost and center of operations while the first Mission San Buenaventura was being constructed. The first mission burned in 1801 and a replacement building of brick and stone was completed in 1809. The bell tower and facade of the new mission was destroyed by an 1812 earthquake. The Mission was rebuilt and functions as a parish church.

Mexican era
The Mexican secularization act of 1833 was passed twelve years after Mexico won independence from Spain in 1821. Mission land was sold or given away in large grants called ranchos. Rancho Ex-Mission San Buenaventura was a  grant that included downtown Ventura. The Battle of San Buenaventura was fought in 1838 between competing armies from northern and southern California. Governor Juan Bautista Alvarado granted Rancho San Miguel to Felipe Lorenzana and Raymundo Olivas, whose Olivas Adobe on the banks of the Santa Clara River was the most magnificent hacienda south of Monterey. Fernando Tico also received a Mexican land grant for Ojai and a parcel near the river in downtown Ventura.

American era

Following the American Conquest of California in the Mexican–American War, California became a U.S. territory in 1848 and a U.S. state in 1850. After the American Civil War, settlers came to the area, buying land from the Mexicans, or simply as squatters. Vast holdings were later acquired by Easterners, including railroad magnate Thomas A. Scott. He sent Thomas R. Bard to handle Scott's property.

Ventura had a flourishing Chinese settlement in the early 1880s. The largest concentration of activity, known as China Alley, was just across Main Street from the Mission San Buenaventura.

Ventura Pier was built in 1872 at a cost of $45,000 and was the longest wooden pier in California. Much of the pier was destroyed by a storm in 1995, but it was subsequently rebuilt.

In 1913, the Rincon Sea Level Road and the Ventura River Bridge opened.

The large Ventura Oil Field was first drilled in 1919 and at its peak produced . The development of the oil fields in the 1920s, along with the building of better roads to Los Angeles and the affordability of automobiles, enabled a major real estate boom. Contemporary downtown Ventura is defined by extant buildings from this period. Landmarks built during the oil boom include Ventura Theatre (1928), the First Baptist Church of Ventura (1926), the Ventura Hotel (1926), and the Mission Theatre (1928).

From the south, travel by auto was slow and hazardous, until the completion of a four-lane freeway (US Highway 101) over the Conejo Grade in 1959. This route, which was widened and improved by 1969, is known as the Ventura Freeway, which directly links Ventura with the rest of the Greater Los Angeles.

In 2017, the Thomas Fire started north of Ventura in Santa Paula and the Santa Ana Winds the fire spread into hillside neighborhoods of Ventura and into the area above downtown. Five hundred and four residences burned down in the city.

Geography

Ventura is located northwest of Los Angeles on the California coast. The western portion of the city stretches north along the Ventura River which is characterized by a narrow valley with steeply sloped areas along both sides. The steep slopes of the Ventura foothills abut the northern portion of the community. Much of the eastern portion is on a relatively flat alluvial coastal plain lying along the western edge of the Oxnard Plain. Several Barrancas extend from the foothills to the Santa Clara River which forms the city's southerly boundary. The city extends up to the beginning of the Santa Clara River Valley at the historic community of Saticoy.

Ventura is within a seismically active region like much of California and is crossed by several potentially active fault systems. The Ventura Fault is capable of an 8.0 earthquake and a local tsunami up to 23 feet in height.

Climate

Ventura has a Mediterranean climate, typical of most coastal California cities, with the sea breeze off the Pacific Ocean moderating temperatures. It is not uncommon for the city to be affected by Santa Ana winds off the Transverse Ranges on occasion, which increase temperatures dramatically.

Demographics
The community is registered in the census as San Buenaventura (Ventura).

2010
The 2010 United States Census reported that Ventura had a population of 106,433. The racial makeup of Ventura was 76.6% White, 1.6% African American, 1.2% Native American, 3.4% Asian (0.9% Filipino, 0.6% Chinese, 0.4% Indian, 0.4% Korean, 0.4% Japanese, 0.3% Vietnamese, 0.5% Other), 0.2% Pacific Islander, 5.2% from two or more races. Hispanic or Latino of any race were 31.8% of the population.

The Census reported that 103,940 people (97.7% of the population) lived in households, 755 (0.7%) lived in non-institutionalized group quarters, and 1,738 (1.6%) were institutionalized.

There were 40,438 households, out of which 13,014 (32.2%) had children under the age of 18 living in them, 18,907 (46.8%) were opposite-sex married couples living together, 4,936 (12.2%) had a female householder with no husband present, 2,153 (5.3%) had a male householder with no wife present.  There were 2,621 (6.5%) unmarried opposite-sex partnerships, and 371 (0.9%) same-sex married couples or partnerships. 10,959 households (27.1%) were made up of individuals, and 4,271 (10.6%) had someone living alone who was 65 years of age or older. The average household size was 2.57.  There were 25,996 families (64.3% of all households); the average family size was 3.14.

The population was spread out, with 23,918 people (22.5%) under the age of 18, 9,581 people (9.0%) aged 18 to 24, 28,814 people (27.1%) aged 25 to 44, 29,957 people (28.1%) aged 45 to 64, and 14,163 people (13.3%) who were 65 years of age or older.  The median age was 39.0 years. For every 100 females, there were 97.7 males.  For every 100 females age 18 and over, there were 95.6 males.

The homeowner vacancy rate was 1.3%; the rental vacancy rate was 5.5%.  59,330 people (55.7% of the population) lived in owner-occupied housing units and 44,610 people (41.9%) lived in rental housing units.

2000

As of the census of 2000, there were 100,916 people, 38,524 households, and 25,233 families residing in the city. The population density was 4,790.6 inhabitants per square mile (1,849.3/km2). The racial makeup of the city was 78.8% White, 1.4% African American, 1.2% Native American, 3.0% Asian, 0.2% Pacific Islander, 11.1% from other races, and 4.3% from two or more races. Hispanic or Latino of any race were 30.4% of the population.

There were 38,524 households, out of which 32.1% had children under the age of 18 living with them, 49.2% were married couples living together, 11.7% had a female householder with no husband present, and 34.5% were non-families. 26.5% of all households were made up of individuals, and 9.7% had someone living alone who was 65 years of age or older.  The average household size was 2.56 and the average family size was 3.12.

In the city, the population was spread out, with 25.0% under the age of 18, 7.8% from 18 to 24, 31.5% from 25 to 44, 22.8% from 45 to 64, and 12.8% who were 65 years of age or older.  The median age was 37 years. For every 100 females, there were 96.9 males.  For every 100 females age 18 and over, there were 93.8 males.

The median income for a household in the city was $52,297, and the other income for a family was $60,466. Males had a median income of $43,828 versus $31,793 for females. The per capita income for the city was $25,065.  About 6.4% of families and 9.0% of the population were below the poverty line, including 12.2% of those under age 18 and 5.3% of those age 65 or over.

Economy

Ventura is a popular tourist destination in Southern California, owing to its historic landmarks, beaches, and the local leisure economy. Businesses related to tourism and hospitality account for a significant portion of Ventura's economic activity.

The outdoor clothing manufacturer Patagonia is based in Ventura. Diaper bag manufacturer Petunia Pickle Bottom was founded in Ventura. Research and resource company The Barna Group is located near downtown Ventura.

In 2009 the City of Ventura created Ventura Ventures Technology Center, a business incubator with a high-tech focus. Ventura Ventures Technology Center was created as an economic engine to develop jobs and companies locally, as well as attract entrepreneurs to the area. The Trade Desk was started in the incubator. The Trade Desk, an industry leader in advertising on streaming services, is the second biggest publicly-traded company in Ventura County by market capitalization.

Top employers

According to the city's 2020 Comprehensive Annual Financial Report, the top employers in the city are:

Cannabis

Following the legalization of Cannabis in California, local governments can prohibit companies from growing, testing, and selling cannabis within their jurisdiction by licensing none or only some of these activities but may not prohibit adults from growing, using or transporting marijuana for personal use. The state allows deliveries without local agency licensing at the point of delivery. In November 2020, a ballot measure for taxation of cannabis was approved by city voters. The City Council adopted a resolution allowing a maximum number of cannabis businesses in the city in February 2021. The ordinances allow up to three retail permits and up to 10 distribution permits. In October 2022, the City Manager selected four businesses to be allowed to operate in the city after a lengthy application and ranking process. Three retail and one distribution business without a retail component were selected. Two more permits for the city's coastal zone, which includes downtown were considered and rejected after further information requested from the California Coastal Commission was reviewed. Once the appeals process is completed, applicants work with the city on safety, security, odor control and other issues before opening for business.

Arts and culture

Music venues

The Majestic Ventura Theater is an early 20th-century landmark in the downtown. It has been a venue for concerts such as The Doors, Pearl Jam, Van Halen, X, Ray Charles, Red Hot Chili Peppers, Social Distortion, Bad Religion, Fugazi, Incubus, Tom Petty, They Might Be Giants, and Johnny Cash, as well as homegrown artists like KYLE, Big Bad Voodoo Daddy and Army of Freshmen.

The Ventura County Fairgrounds is the home of the annual Ventura County Fair, and over the years has hosted such acts as Jimi Hendrix, The Grateful Dead, Phish, Smokey Robinson, All American Rejects, Smash Mouth, and Sugar Ray, as well as the Vans Warped Tour. The train station for Amtrak's Pacific Surfliner route is adjacent to the fairgrounds.

Downtown

Downtown Ventura is home to the Mission San Buenaventura, museums, galleries, dining, and shopping. Located in downtown is the historic Ortega Adobe, once home to the Ortega family known for chili products. Downtown Ventura is home to Ventura's ornate city hall. Downtown includes restaurants, wine bars, breweries, and the Rubicon Theatre Company.

In Plaza Park (Chestnut and Santa Clara streets, downtown) stands a large Moreton Bay fig tree.  Across the street, the main post office has murals on interior walls commissioned by the Section of Painting and Sculpture of the U.S. Treasury Department as New Deal art.

Other sites

Ventura Harbor has fishing boats, seafood restaurants and a retail center, the Ventura Harbor Village. The Channel Islands National Park Headquarters is also located at the harbor, and boats to the Channel Islands depart daily.

The Olivas Adobe, one of the early "California Rancho"-styled homes, is operated as a museum and performing arts venue. Living history reenactments, demonstrations of Rancho life and ghost stories are presented. A summer music series of performances held in the courtyard features an eclectic assortment of artists from blues to jazz to country.

"Two Trees" is two lone trees on a hilltop, visible from much of Ventura. Access to the hill is private property. In early October 2017, one of the trees was destroyed by high winds.

Libraries

There are three branches of the Ventura County Library in the City of Ventura: E.P. Foster Library on Main Street, Avenue Library on Ventura Avenue, and Hill Road Library on the east side of the city. Saticoy Library is in the unincorporated area of Saticoy outside the east end of the city of Ventura.

The Evelyn and Howard Boroughs Library of Ventura College, dedicated in 2005, serves the students, faculty and staff of the college as well as the general public of Ventura County.

The Research Library of the Museum of Ventura County holds books and archival materials related to the history of the county and surrounding regions. Its holdings are catalogued in the Ventura County Library system and the Central Coast Museum Consortium, and the library is open to the public.

Ventura County Law Library, located in the Ventura County Government Center, makes current legal resources available to judges, lawyers, government officials, and other users.

Sports
Ventura is famed for the quality and frequency of the surfing conditions at spots such as Surfer's Point near the Ventura County Fairgrounds.

Ventura is the home to the soccer clubs Ventura County Football Club and Ventura County Fusion, of the USL Premier Development League.

Government

Ventura had an at-large system of electing council members but changed to seven council districts in 2018 due to threatened legal action based on the California Voting Rights Act. Council members have 4-year terms and their elections are staggered so three or four are up for re-election every two years. The council elects from among its own members a mayor and deputy mayor who serve two-year terms.

Joe Schroeder was selected as Mayor of San Buenaventura in December 2022. Ventura is located within California's 26th congressional district, with Julia Brownley currently serving as its representative in the U.S. Congress.

Education

Ventura has four college campuses: Ventura College of Law, Southern California Institute of Law, Santa Barbara Business College and Ventura College. Ventura College of Law is a non-profit law school founded in 1969.  Ventura College is a community college, part of the Ventura County Community College District.   The Brooks Institute of Photography shut down in 2016 after many years in the community.

Public school students from kindergarten through 12th grade attend schools in the Ventura Unified School District. The district has five high schools: Ventura High in the midtown area, Buena High in east Ventura, Foothill Technology High School, Pacific High School and El Camino High School, an independent study program located on the Ventura College campus.  Private schools include St. Bonaventure High School, a Catholic school, Ventura County Christian School, Ventura Missionary School, evangelical Christian schools, and Holy Cross School, Sacred Heart, and Our Lady of the Assumption, Roman Catholic schools for grades pre-kindergarten through 8.

Infrastructure

Transportation
The major road through Ventura is the Ventura Freeway (U.S. Route 101), connecting the California Central Coast and San Francisco to the north, and Los Angeles to the south. State Route 33, the Ojai Freeway, heads north to Ojai. State Route 126 and State Route 118 head east to Santa Clarita and Simi Valley, respectively.

The East Ventura Station, in the historic Montalvo neighborhood, serves as the western terminus of the Ventura County Line of the Metrolink commuter rail system, which extends to Union Station in Los Angeles. The downtown Ventura Amtrak Station is served by Amtrak's Pacific Surfliner from San Luis Obispo to San Diego. 
 
Local bus service is provided by Gold Coast Transit. Commuter and intercity bus services are provided by VCTC Intercity and by MTD to Santa Barbara.

Utilities

Ventura provides water to its residents and some unincorporated areas near the city. Water sources are Lake Casitas, the Ventura River, and groundwater. The water system includes 3 treatment plants, 10 wells, and 27 reservoirs.

Sanitary sewer services are treated at a single plant  in 1955. The plant, within a former portion of the estuary of the Santa Clara River, has ponds of treated water that attract birds. Some recycled water from the plant is used for landscaping and other non potable uses.

The Montalvo Community Services District looked at the cost of a new treatment plant in 2014 and considered having the city take over their service area and dissolve the district. The Montalvo Municipal Improvement District had been formed 60 years prior to bringing sewer service to what was then a remote unincorporated area southeast of Ventura. The city of Ventura annexed the last unincorporated portions of Montalvo in 2012 and had already begun to provide water to the community before the annexation.

Neighborhoods
 Arundell
 College
 Downtown
 Hillsides
 Hobson Heights
 Juanamaria
 Midtown
 Montalvo
 North Bank
 Olivias
 Pierpoint
 Poinsettia
 Saticoy
 Serra
 Taylor Ranch
 Thille
 Wells
 Westside

In popular culture

Film
The movies Swordfish, Little Miss Sunshine and Erin Brockovich were partially filmed in Ventura.

The comedy film The Bet was filmed entirely in the city of Ventura and was written by Ventura residents Chris Jay and Aaron Goldberg, both members of the band Army of Freshmen. 

Books
Ventura was fictionalized as "Madison City" by long-time resident Erle Stanley Gardner in his D.A. series of crime novels featuring Doug Selby, the crusading district attorney of a rural California county.

Ventura is the setting for Julie Carobini's 2007 book Chocolate Beach.

Other
The macOS Ventura operating system was presented at Apple's Worldwide Developers Conference (WWDC2022) on June 6, 2022, after having been named after the city.

The America song "Ventura Highway" was inspired by the feel of the coastal highway running through Ventura, when the songwriter saw the sign to Ventura on a childhood family trip.

Ventura is a course in Tony Hawk's Pro Skater 2. It was called "Skatestreet Ventura".

Notable people
Kevin Costner, actor, attended Buena High School. 
Zachary Levi, actor, attended Buena High School.
Natasha Halevi, actress and director, attended Saint Bonaventure High School. She is married to actor Sean Gunn.
James Ennis III, basketball player for the Philadelphia 76ers, was born in Ventura.
Frank Churchill, composer for Disney, began his career in Ventura.
Theodosia Burr Shepherd (1845–1906) was an American botanist, horticulturist and pioneer in plant breeding. She was called the “Flower Wizard of California”, and "The Pioneer Seed-grower", as she was the first woman in California and possibly in the United States to hybridize flowers. Her seed and bulb business, the Theodosia B. Shepherd Company, is considered to be the foundation of the California seed industry and is listed as number 34 in the City of Ventura Historic Landmarks and Districts. She was compared favorably to Luther Burbank.
Erle Stanley Gardner (1889–1970) created the fictional lawyer Perry Mason, who appeared first in novels and then later in a television series from 1957 to 1966, followed by several "made-for-TV" movies in the 1980s. Gardner himself was a lawyer and did much of his early writing in Downtown Ventura. The First National Bank building at California and Main streets, where Gardner's law office was located, bears his name on a state historical marker and is also identified as the "Erle Stanley Gardner Building" over the front entrance.
Steven Thrasher (born 1978), American journalist and academic
Cirith Ungol, a heavy metal band who formed in Ventura in 1972 and are still active.
Fernando Librado (1839–1915), a Chumash elder and master builder of the tomol born at Mission San Buenaventura. He worked extensively with John Peabody Harrington in his later life to record much about the Chumash people, language, and culture.

Sister cities
  Loreto, Baja California Sur (Mexico)

See also

Foster Park Bowl
City of Ventura Historic Landmarks and Districts

References

External links

Ventura, California on City Data
Movies and televisions shows filmed in Ventura
Ventura Visitor's and Convention Bureau
Ventura Port District
Ventura Chamber of Commerce

 
1866 establishments in California
Cities in Ventura County, California
County seats in California
Incorporated cities and towns in California
Populated coastal places in California
Populated places established in 1866
Port cities in California
Seaside resorts in California
Spanish mission settlements in North America